Mihály Pataki (7 December 1893 in Budapest – 28 November 1977 in Budapest) was a Hungarian amateur football player who competed in the 1912 Summer Olympics. He was a member of the Hungarian Olympic squad and played one match in the main tournament as well as one match in the consolation tournament. In the final of the consolation tournament he scored one goal against Austria.

References

1893 births
1977 deaths
Hungarian footballers
Ferencvárosi TC footballers
Hungary international footballers
Olympic footballers of Hungary
Footballers at the 1912 Summer Olympics
Association football forwards
Footballers from Budapest